Jackson Township is a township in Linn County, Iowa, organized in 1855. It was probably named by an early settler who was an admirer of President Andrew Jackson.

References

Townships in Linn County, Iowa
Townships in Iowa
1855 establishments in Iowa
Populated places established in 1855